Atmos is an album by Czech bassist Miroslav Vitouš featuring Norwegian saxophonist Jan Garbarek recorded in 1992 and released on the ECM label.

Reception 
The Allmusic review by Scott Yanow awarded the album 3 stars stating "Garbarek does emit some passion on soprano and Vitouš augments the music at times with some percussive sounds made by hitting his bass; once  he also adds brief samples from what he calls "the Miroslav Vitouš Symphony Orchestra Sound Library." But in general this is a stereotypical ECM date, recommended to fans of that genre"

Track listing 
All compositions by Miroslav Vitouš except as indicated
 "Pegasos" - 6:21 
 "Goddess" - 7:10 
 "Forthcoming" - 4:04 
 "Atmos" - 5:09 
 "Time Out Part 1" (Jan Garbarek, Miroslav Vitouš) - 2:50 
 "Direvision" - 4:51 
 "Time Out Part 2" (Garbarek, Vitouš) - 2:16 
 "Helikon" - 3:00 
 "Hippukrene" - 6:52 
 Recorded at Rainbow Studio in Oslo, Norway in February 1992

Personnel 
 Miroslav Vitouš - bass
 Jan Garbarek - soprano saxophone, tenor saxophone

References 

1992 albums
ECM Records albums
Miroslav Vitouš albums
Jan Garbarek albums
Albums produced by Manfred Eicher